The 1993 IAAF World Race Walking Cup was held on 24 and 25 April 1993 in the streets of Monterrey, Mexico.  The event was also known as IAAF/Reebok World Race Walking Cup.  For the first time, event specific team standings were introduced for the men's 20 km and 50 km competitions.

Complete results were published.

Medallists

Results

Men's 20 km

Team (20 km Men)

Men's 50 km

Team (50 km Men)

Lugano Trophy (Team overall Men)
The Lugano Trophy, combined the 20km and 50km events team results.

Women's 10 km

Eschborn Cup (Team Women 10 km)

Participation
The participation of 303 athletes (205 men/98 women) from 36 countries is reported.

 (-/3)
 (6/5)
 (8/4)
 (6/3)
 (6/5)
 (5/5)
 (4/-)
 (3/-)
 (7/-)
 (3/3)
 (8/3)
 (10/4)
 (9/4)
 (7/-)
 (3/-)
 (8/5)
 (10/5)
 (-/3)
 (-/3)
 (3/-)
 (4/-)
 (10/5)
 (4/-)
 (5/-)
 (-/4)
 (9/4)
 (-/5)
 (10/5)
 (9/-)
 (6/-)
 (9/5)
 (6/3)
 (4/-)
 (6/3)
 (8/4)
 (10/5)

References

External links
IAAF World Race Walking Cup 1961-2006 Facts & Figures - IAAF.org

World Athletics Race Walking Team Championships
World Race Walking Cup
World Race Walking Cup
International athletics competitions hosted by Mexico